The L4 and L5, also called the Ribbon Gun, is a prototype, caseless, multi-bore selective fire rifle with an electronic firing system. The firearm was designed and built by Martin Grier, of Forward Defense Munitions, based in Colorado Springs, spending $500,000 in development. In 2018, The U.S. Army requested a prototype for testing as a potential replacement for the M16 rifle.

References

External links 
 Forward Defense Munitions website
 FDM Promotional Video (YouTube)
 

Multiple-barrel firearms
Caseless firearms